Opened in 1931, the Canadian National Railway (CNR) steel truss swing span railway bridge over the north arm of the Fraser River in Metro Vancouver links Burnaby with Richmond and the south arm Vancouver Fraser Port Authority facilities on Lulu Island.

The Canadian Northern Railway (CNoR) had planned to lay track from the north end of the New Westminster Bridge and cross the Fraser at the 1931 location. However, when the CNoR opened the Lulu Island branch line in 1917, it connected with the British Columbia Electric Railway (BCER) Queensborough terminus. Since the original BCER Queensborough bridge was designed for trams, not heavy locomotives, the CNoR westward route  to Steveston was an isolated branch line. After the CNR absorption of the bankrupt CNoR, the money-losing branch, and damage to trestles from a 1918 muskeg fire at Mile 4, terminated all services.

In July 1930, work began on sinking piers for the 4,200-foot-long bridge with a 240-foot central span. On completion in November 1931, work trains carried the steel rails across the bridge to lay  of track for the Lulu Island industrial branch line. This comprised two north–south lines from west of the new bridge to connect with the remnants of the original east–west line at the south arm, with a scheduled completion date for the $2m project before yearend.

Owing to the proximity of several bridges on the Fraser, the unique signal for the opening of the Lulu Island Bridge was four long blasts on the vessel's horn.

In 2013, CN removed the observer-operators from three movable span bridges in the Lower Mainland comprising the Second Narrows, New Westminster and Lulu Island bridges, and now monitors river traffic by camera from a central location.

See also
 List of crossings of the Fraser River
 List of bridges in Canada

References

Canadian National Railway bridges in Canada
Railway bridges in British Columbia
Swing bridges in Canada
Bridges completed in 1920
Bridges in Greater Vancouver
Buildings and structures in Burnaby
Buildings and structures in Richmond, British Columbia
Bridges over the Fraser River
Steel bridges in Canada